El Guamo is a town and municipality located in the Bolívar Department, northern Colombia.

Sources
 El Guamo municipal website  

Municipalities of Bolívar Department